Rio Blanco Lake State Wildlife Area, including the Rio Blanco Lake reservoir, is recreational area operated by the Colorado Parks and Wildlife. It is located in White River City in Rio Blanco County, Colorado. Located on 383 acres, recreational activities include fishing and camping. Facilities include a boat ramp and restrooms.

See also
 Colorow Mountain State Wilderness Area

References

External links
 Rio Blanco Lake State Wildlife Area, Colorado Parks and Wildlife

Bodies of water of Rio Blanco County, Colorado
State parks of Colorado
Wildlife management areas of Colorado